Moscow City Duma District 26 is one of 45 constituencies in Moscow City Duma. The constituency has covered parts of Southern Moscow since 2014. From 1993-2005 District 26 was based in South-Western Moscow; however, after the number of constituencies was reduced to 15 in 2005, the constituency was eliminated.

Members elected

Election results

2001

|-
! colspan=2 style="background-color:#E9E9E9;text-align:left;vertical-align:top;" |Candidate
! style="background-color:#E9E9E9;text-align:left;vertical-align:top;" |Party
! style="background-color:#E9E9E9;text-align:right;" |Votes
! style="background-color:#E9E9E9;text-align:right;" |%
|-
|style="background-color:"|
|align=left|Mikhail Vyshegorodtsev (incumbent)
|align=left|Independent
|
|58.37%
|-
|style="background-color:"|
|align=left|Ruslan Khrustalev
|align=left|Communist Party
|
|15.26%
|-
|style="background-color:"|
|align=left|Gennady Pchelnikov
|align=left|Independent
|
|8.16%
|-
|style="background-color:"|
|align=left|Vladimir Kuzin
|align=left|Independent
|
|5.41%
|-
|style="background-color:#000000"|
|colspan=2 |against all
|
|10.40%
|-
| colspan="5" style="background-color:#E9E9E9;"|
|- style="font-weight:bold"
| colspan="3" style="text-align:left;" | Total
| 
| 100%
|-
| colspan="5" style="background-color:#E9E9E9;"|
|- style="font-weight:bold"
| colspan="4" |Source:
|
|}

2014

|-
! colspan=2 style="background-color:#E9E9E9;text-align:left;vertical-align:top;" |Candidate
! style="background-color:#E9E9E9;text-align:left;vertical-align:top;" |Party
! style="background-color:#E9E9E9;text-align:right;" |Votes
! style="background-color:#E9E9E9;text-align:right;" |%
|-
|style="background-color:"|
|align=left|Kirill Shchitov
|align=left|United Russia
|
|51.37%
|-
|style="background-color:"|
|align=left|Yevgeny Balashov
|align=left|Communist Party
|
|32.32%
|-
|style="background-color:"|
|align=left|Yury Medovar
|align=left|Yabloko
|
|6.01%
|-
|style="background-color:"|
|align=left|Vladislav Fedosov
|align=left|Liberal Democratic Party
|
|4.31%
|-
|style="background-color:"|
|align=left|Andrey Proydakov
|align=left|A Just Russia
|
|3.02%
|-
| colspan="5" style="background-color:#E9E9E9;"|
|- style="font-weight:bold"
| colspan="3" style="text-align:left;" | Total
| 
| 100%
|-
| colspan="5" style="background-color:#E9E9E9;"|
|- style="font-weight:bold"
| colspan="4" |Source:
|
|}

2019

|-
! colspan=2 style="background-color:#E9E9E9;text-align:left;vertical-align:top;" |Candidate
! style="background-color:#E9E9E9;text-align:left;vertical-align:top;" |Party
! style="background-color:#E9E9E9;text-align:right;" |Votes
! style="background-color:#E9E9E9;text-align:right;" |%
|-
|style="background-color:"|
|align=left|Kirill Shchitov (incumbent)
|align=left|Independent
|
|37.27%
|-
|style="background-color:"|
|align=left|Vladimir Kalinin
|align=left|A Just Russia
|
|25.03%
|-
|style="background-color:"|
|align=left|Andrey Ispolatov
|align=left|Communist Party
|
|13.10%
|-
|style="background-color:"|
|align=left|Svetlana Anisimova
|align=left|Communists of Russia
|
|11.45%
|-
|style="background-color:"|
|align=left|Ilya Aksenov
|align=left|Liberal Democratic Party
|
|9.07%
|-
| colspan="5" style="background-color:#E9E9E9;"|
|- style="font-weight:bold"
| colspan="3" style="text-align:left;" | Total
| 
| 100%
|-
| colspan="5" style="background-color:#E9E9E9;"|
|- style="font-weight:bold"
| colspan="4" |Source:
|
|}

Notes

References

Moscow City Duma districts